Nils Patrik Haginge (born 2 April 1985) is a Swedish former professional footballer who played as a defender.

Club career 
Haginge started his career at Mellringe-Ekers IF and played there until 2001 when he moved to Örebro SK. He made his Allsvenskan debut against Landskrona BoIS on 18 April 2004. After seven seasons and 89 appearances for Örebro, Haginge moved to Djurgårdens IF during the summer 2008. On 3 February 2011 Patrik signed a contract with his old team Örebro SK after playing 53 games for Djurgården. He retired from professional football in 2017.

International career 
He won twelve caps for the Sweden U19 team and four caps for the Sweden U21 team between the years 2003 and 2004.

References

External links

Living people
1985 births
Swedish footballers
Sweden under-21 international footballers
Sweden youth international footballers
Allsvenskan players
Superettan players
Djurgårdens IF Fotboll players
Örebro SK players
Association football defenders
Sportspeople from Örebro